The 1992 British League Division Two season was contested as the second division of Speedway in the United Kingdom.

Summary
The title was won by the Peterborough Panthers.

Mildenhall Fen Tigers and Milton Keynes Knights both withdrew from the league in June and their results were expunged.

The season had a sad end when on 13 September Wayne Garratt crashed riding for Newcastle Diamonds against Peterborough. He suffered a brain injury and was placed on a life support machine but died 15 days later.

Final table

British League Division Two Knockout Cup
The 1992 British League Division Two Knockout Cup was the 25th edition of the Knockout Cup for tier two teams. Peterborough Panthers were the winners of the competition.

First round

Quarter-finals

Semi-finals

Final
First leg

Second leg

Peterborough were declared Knockout Cup Champions, winning on aggregate 99–81.

Final leading averages

Riders & final averages
Berwick

Richard Knight 10.32
David Walsh 8.38
David Blackburn 8.07
Scott Lamb 6.68
Scott Robson 6.52
Chris Readshaw 4.92
Michael Lowrie 2.53

Edinburgh

Les Collins 8.85 
Kenny McKinna 8.44
Michael Coles 8.02
Johnny Jorgensen 6.93
Brett Saunders 6.68
Dariusz Fliegert 4.90
Mike McLuskey 3.36
Mike Lewthwaite 3.26
John Wainwright 2.61

Exeter

Richard Green 8.80
Paul Fry 7.52
Peter Jeffery 6.60
Frank Smart 6.57 
Colin Cook 6.44
Mark Simmonds 6.27
Ian Humphreys 4.74
Tommy Palmer 2.88

Glasgow

Shane Bowes 8.96 
Robert Nagy 8.61
Neil Collins 8.37
Steve Lawson 7.90
Mick Powell 5.62 
Jesper Olsen 4.78
James Grieves 4.59
Jason Straughan 2.92

Long Eaton

Jan Stæchmann 9.87
Carl Blackbird 8.03
Richard Hellsen 7.07
Deon Prinsloo 6.00
Martin Dixon 5.84
Gary O'Hare 5.41
Nigel Sparshott 4.85

Middlesbrough
 
Steve Regeling 9.12
Darren Sumner 7.72
David Cheshire 6.44
Mark Lemon 5.78
Paul Whittaker .5.26
Doug Nicol 5.22
Duncan Chapman 5.09
Donny Odom 4.41
Paul Pickering 2.96
Stuart Swales 2.73

Mildenhall (withdrew from league)

Nigel Leaver 8.61
Melvyn Taylor 7.24
Mikael Teurnberg 6.67
David Smart 6.10
Jamie Habbin 5.55
Jesper Olsen 5.14
Gary Tagg 4.29
Jason Gage 3.64

Milton Keynes (withdrew from league)

Peter Glanz 8.92
Richard Hellsen 7.60
David Steen 6.91
Kieran McCullagh 6.00
Frank Smart 4.40
Justin Walker 3.43
Ian Barney 2.86

Newcastle

David Bargh 9.89 
Mark Thorpe 9.30
Scott Norman 7.67 
Phil Jeffrey 6.42
Richard Juul 5.49
Wayne Garratt 4.63
Max Schofield 4.61
David Nagel 2.93

Peterborough

Mick Poole 8.77
Jason Crump 8.40
Stephen Davies 8.16
Rod Colquhoun 6.46
Neville Tatum 6.44
Mark Blackbird 5.93
Paul Hurry 5.64

Rye House

Martin Goodwin 9.67
Jens Rasmussen 7.52
Jan Pedersen 7.08
Mikael Teurnberg 6.51
Sean Courtney 6.15
Mark Courtney 5.89
Robert Ledwith 4.83
Chris Young 3.30

Sheffield

Neil Evitts 9.71
Peter Carr 9.47 
Tony Langdon 9.21 
Louis Carr 5.64
Simon Green 4.40
Steve Johnston 3.96
Mark Hepworth 3.73
Steve Knott 3.71

Stoke

Nigel Crabtree 8.66
Alan Grahame 8.36
Eric Monaghan 7.61
Gary Chessell 6.67
Garry Stead 5.68
David Steen 5.68
Andy Meredith 3.46
Darren Standing 2.18

See also
List of United Kingdom Speedway League Champions
Knockout Cup (speedway)

References

Speedway British League Division Two / National League